Silvano d'Orba is a comune (municipality) in the Province of Alessandria in the Italian region Piedmont, located about  southeast of Turin and about  south of Alessandria.

The municipality of Silvano d'Orba contains the frazioni (subdivisions, mainly villages and hamlets) Valle Cochi, Pieve, Bacchetti, Guastarina, Pagliara, Villa, Milanesi, Setteventi, Ravino, Bolla, Pagliaccia, Bordini, Pianterasso, Bessica, Prieto, Castagnola, Caraffa, and Passada.

Silvano d'Orba borders the following municipalities: Capriata d'Orba, Castelletto d'Orba, Lerma, Ovada, Rocca Grimalda, and Tagliolo Monferrato.

Demographic evolution

References

Cities and towns in Piedmont